Roberto Mangú, also known as Roberto Mangu Quesada, and Roberto Mangou, is a contemporary artist, best known as a painter, who is also noted for his sculptures, installations, etchings and work as an architect. Born in 1948 and raised in France, from Italian and Spanish descent, Mangú self-defines as European.

Biography

After a sculpture apprenticeship between 1963 and 1966 in the workshop of Mario Luisetti, Roberto Mangú studies at the École nationale supérieure des Beaux-Arts where he earned a degree in architecture.

During his first period, between 1981 and 1986, he works in Paris where he paints monumental paintings: Aldébaran, Bételgeuse, Dolce Vita, which are shown at the Georges Lavrov art gallery and published in the Artforum review in 1983.

Between 1987 and 1995, Roberto Mangú lives in Milan where he notably paints a series of standing men (Hommes Debout / Uomini in piedi) that are shown among other places by Philippe Daverio and at the Musée Cantini in Marseilles. The paintings Corpus Mundi, San Francisco, or Le Bateau Ivre (inspired by Rimbaud's poem) are representative of this Milanese period.

Even though he worked as an architect at this period — Roberto Mangú built a villa in Asnières near Paris which gathered him great international praise — he self defines as a painter.

In 1995, Roberto Mangú moved to Spain where he resided in Sevilla then in Madrid. This is where Mintak was born in the shadow of a picture on San Francesco (a theme formerly painted by Zurbaran). Mangú defines Mintak as born from what he calls "the Jaguar spirit", and which is for him the figure of life and permanence.

Between 2001 and 2004, Roberto Mangú moved to a place near Toulouse where his art is once more deeply renewed. Inspired by the landscapes and a pilgrimage to Santiago de Compostela, he develops new series including houses drawn in recess or pathways that seem to burst the painting (Camino de Santiago, Via Natura, Les Blés à la Cadiscié)

After living in Brussels, Roberto Mangú returned to France where he worked on new colours: the orange of his Permanenza period (shown in the works: Le Visage d'une Eve, La Suite du Temps, Salvador) then the calmer blue of his Mar Adentro period. He also developed the series of the previous period (his Maisons become Codex, Mintak haunts new series like Ombra dell'Inizio or Rivage).

Roberto Mangú has also had dozens of personal exhibitions of his paintings in galleries in France, Spain, Belgium and Italy.

Works

Formal Aspects

Because of the vitality shown in his earlier paintings notably "Virée sur la côte"  or "Taureau mécanique", his extraordinary knowledge and skillful use of colours especially intense reds (cf Lola), his work is sometimes mistakenly cited as belonging to one of the following movements: neo-expressionism, or Transavantgarde. Some have also wrongly likened his work to that of the nouveaux fauves.

As Alessandra Troncana remarks in the Corriere della Serra Mangú's work is far too original and personal to be so easily classified. Over time, he has shifted to darker colours and used a variety of techniques, working notably sometimes in negative: the object is drawn by taking off (rather than adding) colour through painting large surfaces in white on a coloured background (the "Pan y Vino" series). Later Mangú returned to colour, especially with the intense orange of his Permanenza period before coming back to calmer blues in his Mar Adentro period.

Themes

There are recurring themes in the work of Mangú. In Le Cœur émeraude de Roberto Mangú, Alain Santacreu sees in this the expression of "an ancestral pictorial tradition, primordial, rooted in the religiosity of origins."

Philippe Daverio wrote: "tu per me rappresenti una Spagna pittorica che non ha nulla a che vedere con i libri di storia dell’arte e ancor meno con i musei di Madrid. Ciò che mi ha colpito, la prima volta che ho visto i tuoi quadri, è lo spirito feroce, ribelle e indomabile che li animava. Ciò che mi ha convinto della loro autenticità, era quanto essi corrispondessero al tuo aspetto medesimo. Tu non hai ricominciato a dipingere. Tu hai sempre dipinto. E persisti nel dipingere a modo tuo, con tanto vigore. La tua visione fisica e corporale, la tua visione metafisica, è come le tue radici lontane nelle vie di Parigi, quelle dei gitani".

In the 1980-90s, these themes include standing men, monoliths, saints, which all seem to converge in his large masterpiece, a dark picture of a "Saint George"
In the 2000-10s, according to Gwen Garnier-Duguy in Le Sens de l'Épopée, three central themes run through Roberto Mangú's paintings: Mintak, seen as an Aleph by Santacreu, Permanenza and La Refloraison du Monde

Main individual exhibitions
 1983, Galerie Georges Lavrov, Paris
 1984, Galerie Catherine Macé, Cannes. 
 1984, Galerie Georges Lavrov, Paris
 1985, Galerie Catherine Macé, Cannes
 1988, Galeria  Ontiveros, Madrid
 1989, Galerie Catherine Macé, Cannes. 
 1989, Galerie Ontiveros, Madrid
 1990, Galeria Ontiveros, Madrid
 1991, Galleria Philippe Daverio, Milan
 1992, Galleria Philippe Daverio, Milan
 1995, Galleria Philippe Daverio, Milan
 1998, "Saint Georges", Galerie Georges Fall, Paris
 2001, Palazzo delle Stelline, Centre Culturel Français, Milan
 2003, "Regard", Centro Mostre per l'Arte Contemporanea Venti Correnti, Milan
 2005, "Roberto Mangú", MUDIMAdrie (Fondazione Mudima), Anvers
 2006, "Fuego", Centro Mostre per l'Arte Contemporanea Venti Correnti, Milan
 2007, "Permanenza", Galleria L’Archimede, Roma
 2008, "Permanenza", Galerie La Trace, Paris
 2008, "Permanenza", Galerie Stella & Vega, Brest
 2011, "Itinérance I, « Autour d'un tableau » de Roberto Mangú", Stella & Vega Production, Galerie Janos, Paris
 2012, "Mar Adentro", Museo di Santa Giulia, Brescia

Main collective exhibitions

 1983, Galerie Georges Lavrov, Paris 
 1983, Galerie Georges Lavrov, Saint – Tropez
 1984, Salon d'art contemporain de Montrouge, Paris 
 1984, Art Basel 84, Bâle 
 1984, International Contemporary Art Fair, Londres
 1985, Salon d'art contemporain de Montrouge, Paris. 
 1985, Salon de Mai, Paris. 
 1985, International Contemporary Art Fair, Londres
 1986, Galerie Catherine Macé, Cannes. 
 1986, Galerie Georges Lavrov, Paris. 
 1986, Art Jonction, Nice. 
 1986, Galerie Ontiveros, Madrid
 1987, Masques d’artistes, La Malmaison, Cannes. 
 1987, Maisons, examples choisis, Institut français d'architecture, Paris
 1989, Galerie Dacal, Madrid. 
 1989, Galerie Catherine Macé, Cannes. 
 1989, "Mangú, Pacea", Galeria Ontiveros, Madrid
 1990, "Le Paradis des Peintres", Musée de la Castre, Cannes
 1990, Galeria Ontiveros, Madrid.
 1990, Galleria Shubert, Milan
 1991, "Les Couleurs de l’Argent", Musée de la Poste, Paris
 1992, "Arthur Rimbaud et les artistes du XXe siècle", Musée Cantini, Marseille
 1993, Galleria Philippe Daverio, Milan
 1994, "Alternative", Galleria Philippe Daverio, Milan
 1994, "Il Corpo", Galleria Philippe Daverio, Milan
 1995, Coll.priv, Palazzo delle Stelline, Milan
 1995, "Art Tabac", sous la direction de Pierre Restany, Scuderie di Palazzo Ruspoli, Rome
 1996, Coll.priv, Palazzo delle Stelline, Milan
 1996, "Anni’90 a Milano", Sala Napoleonica, Accademia di Brera, Milan
 1998, "Accrochage", Galerie Georges Fall, Paris
 1999, "Babelia", MiArt (Galleria Philippe Daverio), Milan
 1999, Fiera d’arte contemporanea di Milan
 2001, Galerie Antoine Ranc, T.S.F. Paris
 2002, Linéart, foire d’art moderne & contemporain (Galerie Antoine Ranc), Ghent
 2004, "De leur temps : collections privées françaises", ADIAF, Musée des Beaux-Arts de Tourcoing
 2004, Art Paris, foire d’art moderne & contemporain (Centro Mostre per l'Arte Contemporanea Venti Correnti), Paris
 2005, Art Paris, foire d’art moderne & contemporain (Centro Mostre per l'Arte Contemporanea Venti Correnti), Paris
 2005, Centro Mostre per l'Arte Contemporanea Venti Correnti, Milan.
 2006, "Figures et Portraits", Stella & Vega Production, Brest
 2007, "Papiers d’artistes", Stella & Vega Production, Brest et Paris
 2007, Centro Mostre per l'Arte Contemporanea Venti Correnti, Milan 
 2008, "Collection privée""", Stella Collection, Brest
 2010, "10 sérigraphies", Sérithèque, Montpellier
 2011, '""10 Artistes, Galerie Janos", Paris
 2012 "4 hispaniques en noir et blanc +une", Galerie Janos, Paris

Bibliography
 Roberto Mangú has been the subject of academic work by researchers at La Sorbonne, including a Master's dissertation  and a PhD
 Gérard George Lemaire in "9 artistes à Milan aujourdh'hui"
 Opus International N° 119 Paris mai juin 1990
 Mangú. Le passager des étoiles, Jean-François Gautier and Dominique Stella, Mazzotta 1998. 
 Roberto Mangú, Permanenza, Shin Factory, 
 Roberto Mangú: Regard, Dominique Stella, Milan : Mudima, 2002
 Roberto Mangú : Mar adentro, Dominique Stella, Véronique Serrano, Milan : Grafiche Aurora, 2012. 
 Roberto Mangù, Fuego, Milan : Venti Correnti, 2006
 Nox, Gwen Garnier-Duguy and Néro, Editions Le Grand Souffle, Paris, 2006, 
 "Les Enfants de Bonnard", Roberto Mangú in Bonnard et Le Cannet : dans la lumière de la Méditerranée, Véronique Serrano, Paris, Hazan 2011

References

External links
 http://www.undo.net/cgi-bin/undo/pressrelease/pressrelease.pl?id=1193219186&day=1193263200

French contemporary artists
20th-century French painters
20th-century Italian male artists
French male painters
21st-century French painters
21st-century French male artists
20th-century Italian painters
Italian male painters
21st-century Italian painters
20th-century Spanish painters
Spanish male painters
21st-century Spanish painters
French people of Spanish descent
French people of Italian descent
1948 births
Living people
21st-century Italian male artists
21st-century Spanish male artists